Metinota is a resort village in the Canadian province of Saskatchewan within Census Division No. 17. It is on the shores of Jackfish Lake in the Rural Municipality of Meota No. 468.

History 
Metinota incorporated as a resort village on August 19, 1924 under the name of Village of Metinota. The name means “It’s really nice here” to the Cree Nation. Its name was officially changed to the Resort Village of Metinota on August 9, 2019 to match its municipal status.

Demographics 

Government 
The Resort Village of Metinota is governed by an elected municipal council and an appointed administrator. The mayor is Tim Lafreniere and its administrator is Carmen Menssa.

See also 
List of communities in Saskatchewan
List of municipalities in Saskatchewan
List of resort villages in Saskatchewan
List of villages in Saskatchewan
List of summer villages in Alberta

References 

Resort villages in Saskatchewan
Meota No. 468, Saskatchewan
Division No. 17, Saskatchewan